The Game of the Generals, also called GG or GOG as it is most fondly called, or simply The Generals, is an educational war game invented in the Philippines by Sofronio H. Pasola Jr. in 1970. Its Filipino name is "Salpakan." It can be played within twenty to thirty minutes. It is designed for two players, each controlling an army, and a neutral arbiter (sometimes called a referee or an adjutant) to decide the results of "challenges" between opposing playing pieces, that like playing cards, have their identities hidden from the opponent.

The game simulates armies at war trying to overpower, misinform, outflank, outmaneuver and destroy each other. It optimizes the use of logic, memory, and spatial skills. It simulates the "fog of war" because the identities of the opposing pieces are hidden from each player and can only be guessed at by their location, movements, or from the results of challenges. The game allows only one side's plan to succeed, although a player may change plans during the course of the game. In addition, there are two different ways of winning the game (see below). Certain strategies and tactics, however, allow both sides the chance of securing a better idea of the other's plan as the game progresses. Players can also speak or gesture to their opponents during matches, hoping to create a false impression about the identity of their pieces or their overall strategy.

History
This game was invented by Sofronio H. Pasola, Jr. with the inspiration of his son Ronnie Pasola. 

The Pasolas first tried the Game of the Generals on a chessboard. Even then, the pieces had no particular arrangement. There were no spies in the experimental game; but after Ronnie Pasola remembered the James Bond movies and Mata Hari, he added the Spies. Making the pieces hidden was the idea of the Pasolas after remembering card games.

The Game of the Generals public introduction was on February 28, 1973. After the game was made, it angered many Filipino chess players thinking that Pasola was trying to denigrate or supplant chess.

Objective and victory conditions
The objective of the game is to eliminate or capture the Flag of the opponent, or to maneuver one's Flag to the far edge of the board (the opposing back rank), subject to the following conditions.

The Flag, if challenged, is eliminated by any opposing piece, including the opposing and challenging Flag. If a player's Flag is eliminated by a challenge, that player loses the game. The Flag that challenges the opponent's Flag wins the challenge and thus also wins the game.

When the Flag successfully reaches the opponent's back rank, it has to survive one more turn without being challenged before it can declare a victory. If a Flag reaches the opposing back rank and there is no adjacent opposing piece that can challenge it, the Flag wins the game immediately. If a Flag reaches the opposing back rank directly adjacent to an opposing piece, and that piece does not challenge the Flag immediately on the opponent's subsequent turn, then that Flag wins the game. Any player may reveal his Flag at any time and for any reason; play can then continue; most often, a player reveals his Flag after it has already secured victory at the opposing back rank.

Most games end in a victory for one of the players. One player may have lost so many pieces or his pieces are impractically positioned on the board that he feels he can no longer win the game so he decides to resign. However, any player may propose a draw at any time; the opponent can either decline, so play continues, or agree, and thus the game ends in a tie.

At the end of a match, whether as a draw or as a victory for one player, it is courteous but not required to allow the opposing player a view of the surviving pieces before they are taken off the board, as well as of the eliminated pieces.

Equipment

Pieces
The player's set of pieces represent 21 soldiers (combatants) with a hierarchy of ranks and functions. A higher-ranking piece (usually the officers) will eliminate any lower-ranking piece, with the exception of the 2 Spies; the Spies eliminate all pieces except the 6 Privates.

Apart from the Flag (the Philippine Flag) and the Spy (a pair of prying eyes), the rank insignia of the pieces used in the game are those used in the Philippine Army.

The playing pieces are identical-sized plastic or metal flat rectangles that are bent or molded at a 90-degree or 80-degree angle. The rank insignia are printed on the rear side to keep them hidden from the opposing player; the game requires that the front side of the pieces should have no distinguishing marks that will help identify the pieces.

In plastic sets, the colors commonly used in the pieces are black and white. There are also sets composed of wooden boards and aluminum pieces. Those pieces have rank insignia that are printed either red or blue. In metal sets, the color of the board is commonly brown and the pieces are aluminum colored. Some of the cheaper game sets consist of just a rolled up sheet printed with the squares instead of a rigid board, as well as plastic pieces with ranks printed on cardboard.

Note: If both soldiers are of equal rank, both are eliminated (colloquially termed as a "split").

Board

The game is played on a rectangular board with 72 plain squares arranged in 8 ranks and 9 files. To start the game, each player's 21 pieces are placed in various locations within the nearest 3 rows to each player's home side. These are the 27 closest squares, leaving 6 squares open. For example, the Black player in the illustrated example has deployed 21 pieces in Ranks 6, 7, and 8, leaving the squares A8, B8, C8, G8, H8, and I8 open. The White player has also deployed 21 pieces in the nearest 3 Ranks (1, 2, and 3), leaving A2, B3, C3, G2, H3, and I3 open.

A player can consider the half of the board nearest them to be "friendly territory" while the other side's half is the "enemy territory," though this is not an actual rule in the game. The two middle rows (fourth rank from each player's edge of the board) are initially empty at the start of the game and represent "no man's land" or "unconquered territory" that the contending pieces can occupy or leave vacant, depending on each player's strategy.

Although not specifically marked, each player's side of the board can be grouped into three amorphous battle zones, generally consisting of nine squares each: these zones are the "left flank," the "center," and the "right flank," but the boundaries are variable or may be considered psychological in nature.

Initial layout
Unlike chess or its variants, there is no predetermined initial layout for placing the pieces, allowing each player to place the pieces in different squares to his advantage or according to his strategy. The allocation of spaces (6 vacant squares) is important for the tactical movement of the individual pieces in the first three ranks, because a piece that has friendly pieces in front, behind, and on each side is effectively immobilized until a space opens up on these adjacent squares. 

Spaces within the formation should be allocated to provide maneuver room for certain pieces. Beginners often put these six vacant spaces on the rearmost rank (because they don't think these are important) whereas an experienced player sometimes uses this arrangement to try to deceive the opponent into thinking he is a beginner.

Basic gameplay

Moves
There is also no predetermined order of play. The players can decide who goes first; afterward, the players take their turns alternately. Each player can move only one piece per turn.

All pieces have the same move: one square forward, backward, or sideways, as long as it is not blocked by the board's edge or by another friendly piece. A piece cannot move into a square already occupied by a friendly piece. A piece cannot move diagonally nor can it move two or more squares away from its original position.

If a piece moves adjacent to (in front of, behind, or to the side of, but not diagonally from) an opposing piece, the piece that was moved can challenge the opposing piece. For the challenge, a neutral arbiter examines both pieces and removes the lower-ranking piece.

Challenges and arbitration

Notes

Each piece can challenge an opposing piece that is directly adjacent in front, behind, or to either side of it (identical, in effect, to the way it moves). Thus, a piece does not directly threaten an opposing piece that is situated diagonally to it. However, a piece that is known or thought to be stronger can restrict the movement of a weaker opposing piece that is situated diagonally to it by threatening to eliminate it if it moves to a square adjacent to that of the stronger piece.

A player initiates a challenge by placing his/her piece on the adjacent square where an opposing piece is located.

The arbiter then examines the ranks of the opposing pieces, removes the lower-ranked piece off the board, and returns it to the owner regardless of who initiated the challenge. The eliminated pieces are not revealed to the opposing player until the game ends. The arbiter must take care not to reveal the ranks of the pieces to the opposition; nor can he give any verbal or non-verbal clues about the rest of the board layout.

The game can also be played without an arbiter. In this case, when a challenge is made, both players must state the rank of their piece after which the lower-ranked piece is eliminated. Therefore, the presence of the arbiter, though not compulsory, is especially important to ensure secrecy until the game is over. Official games are conducted with an arbiter.

Determining the results of a challenge
Regardless of which piece initiated the challenge, their ranks determine which piece is to be eliminated and removed from the board.

Any one of the player's pieces can capture the opposing Flag. This includes the player's own Flag.
Any piece, except the Spy and the Flag, eliminates the Private.
Officers eliminate other officers that are lower in rank (e.g. a Four-Star General eliminates a Lieutenant Colonel).
A Spy eliminates all officers (including the Five-Star General). Only the Private can eliminate the Spy.
If both pieces are of the same rank, both are removed from the board (often called a "split" by most players and arbiters).
If a Flag challenges the opponent's Flag, the challenging Flag prevails and wins the game.

If a Flag reaches the opposite edge or farthest rank of the board, the opponent has one turn left although it is not announced. After the turn, the player reveals the Flag. If the Flag was not challenged, the player wins the game. If it was challenged, the player loses.

Application of warfare concepts to the game

Combatant roles of the pieces
The playing pieces can be classified according to the following tactical functions and roles:
 Killers - The two Spies and the two most powerful Generals (Five-Star and Four-Star Generals) have the critical job of eliminating the enemy Sweepers and all other pieces, either by aggressive challenging or ambush, to gain a power-level, numerical, or positional advantage against the opponent.
 Sweepers - The next most-powerful officers (Three-Star General down to the Lieutenant Colonel) will take over the Killer function if the Five-Star and Four-Star Generals are eliminated. Their main job is to remove all lower-ranking enemy officers as well as acquire and retain a numerical or positional advantage of friendly pieces over the enemy.
 Probers - These are sacrificial junior officers from the Major down to the Sergeant. Their job is to challenge untested enemy pieces and determine their power so they can either be avoided, ambushed, or targeted for elimination by the Killers or Privates. By eliminating Privates, Probers often act as bodyguards to the Spies and the Flag.
 Privates - Their main job is to eliminate the Spies (in the opening and middle game) and the Flag (in the end game). They usually accompany the highest-ranking officers in order to eliminate the Spy that targets the officers. While they can be considered sacrificial, once there are only one or two Privates left, it becomes very difficult to eliminate the Spies.
 Flag - This is the only piece that can win victory and must be hidden and protected at all costs, except when it has an unobstructed way to the far edge of the board; then it can go for broke. Often, a Private or low-ranking officer is made to act like a scared Flag to deceive the opponent. Sometimes a Flag can try move as if it was a mid-level or low-ranking officer, or as a Private, to avoid being challenged by another piece.

Note: The roles of the Sweepers and Probers can be interchanged in a variety of ways, depending on the preference of the player.

Common strategies and tactics
An experienced Generals player will have tried out and practiced a number of basic strategies. Each strategy starts out with a particular distribution of strong or weaker pieces in the front line or rear areas, as well as in the left flank, center, or right flank. The most common strategies usually depend on clustering or distributing powerful pieces in different areas of the board. In the list below, the first four can be considered "basic" while the last four are relatively "advanced," depending on the experience level or creativity of the player using them.

 Linear Assault - This is a simplistic strategy mostly used by beginners. It consists of powerful units in the front line forming a shield and weaker units at the side and rear line. The whole front line is advanced as a "lawnmower" to try to eliminate most of the enemy. This is not very effective if you immediately lose your front line because the only troops left are the weak ones. The linear formation can be disrupted and broken up by Strongpoints and Clustered Task Forces.
 Blitzkrieg - Amass powerful pieces on one side of the board (left or right), then try to steamroller and blow a hole through the enemy lines by eliminating all the defenders on that flank. Once the way is clear, send the Flag forward with an escort and march on to victory. A Blitz through the center is rare because it requires lining both sides of the corridor with powerful pieces to eliminate possible blockers of your Flag. A disadvantage of the Blitzkrieg is that one flank is strong while the other flank is manned by sacrificial troops; an enemy Blitz that, by chance, is pointed at the weak flank, can punch through it easily.
 Banzai Charge - This is a variation of the Blitzkrieg strategy. Troops are generally divided into three groups. The center group consists of high-ranking units while the two other groups are on the flanks with a few strong units. While trying to blast a hole on either of the two flanks, also send a strong blitzkrieg in the center to make a path for the flag. This strategy can be effective if the opposing player's pieces are immediately eliminated. However, it can be stopped in its tracks if the attacking Killers and Sweepers are immediately or gradually eliminated and there are not enough reserve units to carry the Flag through.
 Slow-Moving Shield - The most high-ranking pieces are formed in the shape of a disk with the Spies and top Generals in the middle lane and center for defense. The Flag is placed in the center-rear for maximum defense and is not really meant to advance to the back row of the enemy territory. The player using this strategy can try to make a slow-moving massed attack up the center or try to guard against offensive probes into the center. It is somewhat vulnerable to the Rampaging Bulls strategy that can penetrate a flank and start eliminating weak pieces in the rear. The Shield formation can be slowly reduced by the Distributed Defense and Clustered Task Forces strategies to eliminate the Spies and Generals.
 Rampaging Bulls - Send unsupported Generals (Sweepers) into the enemy lines to eliminate as many opposing pieces and try to put them in the enemy rear areas to create havoc and disrupt the enemy's plans and composure. Use them to force the enemy to move his Spies or to weaken his front lines so your other high-ranking pieces can make their own rampage. Try to keep the Rampaging Bulls active and alive as long as possible so they continue to threaten enemy pieces left on the board and to help reveal the enemy Spies by their movements. Divert the enemy's attention from the Rampaging Bulls by making other offensive moves elsewhere on the board.
 Strongholds - The Strongholds strategy consists of assembling five units to form a strong point, and it can be shaped similar to a cross (if you want it revealed to the enemy). The remaining troops, with one Spy, are interspersed at the sides and front of the Strongholds. Diagonally placed privates in each group can defend and support to kill enemy Spies while your Five-Star and Four-Star Generals are reserved in the middle of the groups as ambushers by posing as if they were weak pieces. Probers and some Sweepers at the front can help you determine the enemy's high-ranking pieces while threatening to eliminate the enemy Privates and Probers. The stationary Strongholds can start moving forward into offensive mode after some high-ranking enemy pieces or Spies are eliminated.
 Clustered Task Forces - This is similar to the Strongholds strategy but the combatant groups are actively moving around and switching positions often (to try to make the enemy player forget what pieces they might be and where they are). Group a high-ranking general, a Spy, two Privates, and two to three officers into a "combined arms" task force whose job is to eliminate enemy pieces in one area and to reduce his overall numbers. Switch the attack or defensive maneuvers from one Task Force or side of the board to the other as needed to divert the opponent's attention and make him become confused about the identity of your powerful pieces. Use expert maneuvering to isolate the enemy Flag and eliminate it.
 Distributed Defense - Spread out your powerful pieces with supporting units across the entire playing area to probe and ambush the enemy Killer pieces. Maneuver your pieces to rearrange them as blocking forces and to deceive the opponent as to which pieces are powerful or sacrificial. Ensure there are maneuver spaces where your powerful pieces can move to. Put lower-ranking Generals in the rear areas to take over the defense or bring them forward to assist in the counterattack. Using this strategy, one can make limited strikes into enemy territory then withdraw those forces before they become trapped or ambushed. Force the enemy to redeploy his pieces so you can identify the enemy's strong versus the weaker units. After eliminating most of the troops in the front and sides, send forward some troops to try to identify and corner the flag.

Note: All strategies have their pros and cons and you need to know their strengths and weaknesses. But you can often win by deceiving the enemy at just the right instance. Learn the Art of Deception and be ready to change your initial strategy if you can do so.

Switching strategies and changing tactics
A game can have multiple strategies depending on the outcome of the initial challenges. Loss of high-ranking pieces, especially of the Killers, usually stops an offensive action and forces a player to change plans or to go on the defensive. A player needs to muster and redistribute his remaining higher-ranking pieces to avoid the enemy's Killer pieces while continuing to eliminate the mid- and low-ranking pieces. Once numerical balance or superiority is achieved, or if he can outflank the defenders, a player should be able to shift back to offensive Flag-rushing operations.

Deception and psychological warfare can be a major component of the game. Players must memorize the position and probable identity of known enemy pieces because losing track of a possible Killer piece or Private can lead to loss of important pieces. Sometimes a Spy has to be sacrificed against a known enemy Spy in order to clear the way for your Sweepers to eliminate the remaining enemy pieces. Try to keep one or more reserve forces available for various contingencies and to provide multiple tactical options or changes in overall strategy. The art of maneuvering pieces and allocating empty squares in a crowded area is also important to bring your appropriate pieces against enemy pieces, to avoid losses, or to eliminate the enemy Flag.

Variations
There are many variations made by various people to make the game more exciting and difficult. Many variations involve simple modifications like showing the flag or simply playing with only 11 pieces. These modifications are often combined with each other to make the game more challenging.

Krig 
Krig is one of the online variants. Rules are very similar except:

 Players can place one piece in their respective borders
 Players identity is hidden until the end
 Pieces will be revealed at the end

"The Generals Electronic Strategy Game"
In 1980, Ideal released The Generals Electronic Strategy Game. The rules and piece ranks are the same as above, except that the "Spies" are "Agents", and an electronic arbiter determines which piece wins in a confrontation; neither player sees his opponent's pieces. The plastic pieces have selected notches on their bases, which depress certain indentations in the electronic arbiter's twin slots. The lights flash and a short musical phrase plays before a light labeled "battle winner" is illuminated. The losing piece is removed from the board, while the winning piece is placed back on the board. If the flag is placed in the arbiter, it plays "Taps" after the initial musical phrase.

Unlike the original version of the game, if a player's Flag reaches the back row in The Generals Electronic Strategy Game, that player wins, even if an opposing piece occupies an adjacent square on the back row.

Software
Through the years as electronic devices and programming languages evolved and were commercially released, many Filipino computer science students and programmers have created and released their own software versions of Game of the Generals to the public for use on different devices and platforms. The game's rules and mechanics lend themselves well to replacing the human arbiter with an electronic or software version, both to decide the results of challenges, and to indicate if the game has already been won by one player.

To cite an example, a software app downloadable on the Google Play Store for Android smartphones (with touchscreens) called Game of the Generals Mobile was released on 19-Nov-2020 by Mawkins Entertainment. It was last updated on 10-Jul-2022 and is designed for Android version 5.0 and later versions. It has a download size of 47.51 MB and currently has 50,000+ downloads with a user-provided rating of 4.5 out of 5.0. This software package allows online and offline play, allows replays of matches and custom matches, allows play with an AI (artificial intelligence), allows one-on-one play with any player who has the same software, ranks the various players on leaderboards, and allows them to manage their reputations when they start winning matches.

Comparison with Stratego
Generals bears many similarities with Stratego, including a hierarchy/ranking of pieces, invisible enemy piece values, arbitrary initial placement within a player's "home" area, and the use of spies to eliminate high-ranking pieces.

However, unlike Stratego, Generals does not have any bombs, nor miners to defuse them. The Generals spies act as reusable mines, as they will remove almost all pieces when attacked yet are not themselves removed from the board. Generals also does not have scouts, which may cross several spaces across the board in one move. All of the pieces in Generals can move, while both the flag and the bombs in Stratego are stationary. Also, each player has two Spies in Generals, while each only has one Spy in Stratego. In general, Stratego has more pieces than Generals and games accordingly last longer.

In addition, unlike Stratego, which features two "lakes" in the middle of the board, all 72 of the squares on the Generals board are accessible. There are six empty spaces during the initial placement of pieces in the three ranks closest to the player for Generals, while the same three ranks are completely filled in Stratego.

Finally, Generals inherently requires a third-party arbiter to maintain the game's uncertainty all the way to the endgame. Stratego requires that both players' pieces are revealed during a challenge to determine which piece is removed.

Reviews
 The board game was imported to the United States by Atmar Enterprises and shown at the 1978 Toy Fair; Sid Sackson noted it "offers some new twists on Stratego, including ... an arbiter [which] announces the winner of a challenge, without divulging the strength of the pieces involved."
 The electronic version published by Ideal was briefly profiled as part of the 1980 Games 100 in Games magazine; Sackson's review called it an "intriguig battle game".

References

External links
Krig - Windows 10 app Linux Google Play Galaxy store
Online version of Salpakan (Game of the Generals)
SalpakanOnline Game
Official Rules

A Simplified Summary of the Rules on Linked-In's SlideShare

Board games introduced in 1970
Board wargames
Games like Stratego